is a passenger railway station located in the city of Tamba-Sasayama, Hyōgo Prefecture, Japan, operated by West Japan Railway Company (JR West).

Lines

Station layout
The station consists of one ground-level island platform and one ground-level side platform connected by an elevated station building. The station is staffed.

Platforms

Track 1 is mainly used for the Limited express trains "Kounotori" for Osaka and Shin-Osaka (partly from Track 3). It is also used for the rapid services for Osaka.
Track 3 is mainly used for the trains for Fukuchiyama. It is sometimes used for the trains for Osaka.
Track 4 is mainly used for the regional rapid services for Osaka. It is sometimes used for the local trains for Fukuchiyama. Fukuchiyama-bound trains (except limited express trains) are uncoupled at Track 4 in the evening, uncoupled cars become bound for Osaka.

Adjacent stations

History
It was renamed to its present name on 1 March 1944. With the privatization of the Japan National Railways (JNR) on 1 April 1987, the station came under the aegis of the West Japan Railway Company.

Station numbering was introduced in March 2018 with Sasayamaguchi being assigned station number JR-G69.

Passenger statistics
In fiscal 2016, the station was used by an average of 3532 passengers daily

Surrounding area
former Tannan Town
 Japan National Route 176

See also
List of railway stations in Japan

References

External links

 Station Official Site

Railway stations in Hyōgo Prefecture
Railway stations in Japan opened in 1899
Tamba-Sasayama